Dan Tulpan (born 10 June 1957) is a Romanian former footballer who played as a central defender. After he ended his playing career, Tulpan worked as president at Gloria Buzău. He was also a member of the Senate of Romania, being elected in Buzău, while running for PSD.

Honours
Gloria Buzău
Divizia B: 1977–78

Notes

References

1957 births
Living people
Romanian footballers
Association football defenders
Liga I players
Liga II players
FC Gloria Buzău players
FC Argeș Pitești players
Romanian sports executives and administrators
Members of the Senate of Romania
Social Democratic Party (Romania) politicians
Romanian sportsperson-politicians
Footballers from Bucharest